Broadcasters for the Montreal Expos Major League Baseball team.

English
Dave Van Horne (1969–2000)
Ron Reusch  (1969–1992)
Russ Taylor (1969–1976)
Jim Hearne (1969)
Hal Kelly (1969–1970)
Don Drysdale (1970–1971)
Jackie Robinson (1972)
Duke Snider (1973–1986)
Tom Cheek (1974–1976)
Tommy Hutton (1982–1986)
Ken Singleton (1985–1996)
Jim Hughson (1987–1989)
Jim Fanning (1987–1988)
Rob Faulds (1987)
Rich Griffin (1987–1988, 1994)
Jerry Trupiano (1989–1990)
Bobby Winkles (1989–1993)
Elliott Price (1991–1999, 2001–2004)
Jim Price (1996)
Mike Stenhouse (1996)
Gary Carter (1997–1999)
Joe Cannon (1997–2000)
Vic Rauter (2001)
Warren Sawkiw (2001)
Terry Haig (2001–2002)
Mitch Melnick (2003–2004)
Sam Cosentino (2004)
Rance Mulliniks (2004)
Darrin Fletcher (2004)
Warren Cromartie (2004)
Tom Valcke (2004) 
Minor League Broadcasters (2003–2004)

French
Jacques Doucet (1969–2004)
Jean-Pierre Roy (1969–1971)
Guy Ferron (1969–1981)
Jean-Paul Sarault (1970–1971)
Claude Raymond (1972–2001) - also was an English broadcaster in 2004
Raymond Lebrun (1983–1993)
Rodger Brulotte (1984–2001, 2004)
Ed Doucette (1986)
Denis Casavant  (1986–1990 with CKAC, 1990–2001, 2004 with RDS)
Pierre Arsenault (1991)
Alain Chantelois (1993–2000)
Camille Dubé (1994–1996)
Michel Villeneuve (1996–1998)
Marc Griffin (1996–1999, 2001-2004)
Rene Pothier (1997–1999)
Jean St-Onge (2001)

Television broadcast outlets

English
CBC (1969-1989)
TSN (1985-1999, 2001)
Syndicated package produced by TV Labatt (1987-1989)
CTV (1990-1993)
The Score (2004)

French
SRC (1969-1999)
RDS (1990-2001, 2004)
TQS (1995-1998)

Radio broadcast outlets

English
CKGM 980 (1969)
CFCF/CIQC 600 (1970-1988, 1991-1999)
CJAD 800 (1989-1990)
Expos.com (2000)
CKGM 990 (2001-2004)
Note : Some overflow games were heard on CFQR-FM 92.5 (1970-1988) and on CKRK-FM 103.5 (1989-1990); Dave Van Horne's last game as the Expos' play-by-play voice in 2000 was heard online.

French
CKLM 1570 (1969-1971)
CKAC 730 (1972-2003)
CJMS 1040 (2003, official co-flagship for 48 games not available on CKAC 730) 
CHMP-FM 98,5 (2004)
Note : Some overflow games were heard on CKVL 850 in 1995 and on CJMS 1040 in 2002.

See also
MLB on TSN
List of Washington Nationals broadcasters

Notes
1. During the 2003 and 2004 seasons, the Expos used various minor league announcers on its radio broadcasts including Russ Langer, Mike Curto, Tom Valcke, Roberto Clemente, Jr., Brett Dolan, Jim Tocco, Rich Burk, and Roxy Bernstein.

References 

 
Montreal Expos broadcasters
Montreal Expos broadcasters
Montreal Expos broadcasters
Montreal Expos broadcasters
Montreal Expos broadcasters
Montreal Expos broadcasters
Montreal Expos